Lost Cove Cave, also known as Buggytop Cave, is a cave in Franklin County, south Tennessee near the towns of Sewanee and Sherwood and close to the Alabama border.  It is noted for its large main entrance and the extensive archeological artifacts of the Woodland and Mississippian periods found inside.

Description
Lost Cove Cave is a part of the Carter Natural Area section of South Cumberland State Park and is located in Lost Cove. The Peter Cave entrance opens into the so-called Indian Room which has been excavated for archeological artifacts since the 19th century.

Lost Cove Creek (or sometimes simply Lost Creek) is a river that enters the cave from Lost Cove at the Big Sinks and emerges from the Buggytop Entrance of the cave as Crow Creek into Crow Creek Valley.  From there it flows through Sherwood, Tennessee before emptying into the Tennessee River at Guntersville Lake near Stevenson, Alabama, several miles to the south.

Archaeological work by students accomplished between 1959 and 1961 was published in The Tennessee Archaeologist, Vol. XVIII, No. 1 pp. 408 -430

References

 Carter Natural Area: Retrieved January 5, 2010

Wild caves
Caves of Tennessee
Protected areas of Franklin County, Tennessee
Landforms of Franklin County, Tennessee